Jakub Bursztyn (born 25 March 1998) is a Polish professional footballer who plays as a goalkeeper for Skra Częstochowa.

References

Polish footballers
1998 births
Living people
Sportspeople from Gorzów Wielkopolski
Pogoń Szczecin players
Skra Częstochowa players
Association football goalkeepers
Ekstraklasa players
III liga players